Libertarian socialism, also known by various other names, is a left-wing, anti-authoritarian, anti-statist and libertarian political philosophy within the socialist movement which rejects the state's control of the economy under state socialism. Overlapping with anarchism and libertarianism, libertarian socialists criticize wage slavery relationships within the workplace, emphasizing workers' self-management and decentralized structures of political organization. As a broad socialist tradition and movement, libertarian socialism includes anarchist, Marxist, and anarchist- or Marxist-inspired thought and other left-libertarian tendencies.

Libertarian socialism rejects the concept of a state. It asserts that a society based on freedom and justice can only be achieved with the abolition of authoritarian institutions that control specific means of production and subordinate the majority to an owning class or political and economic elite. Libertarian socialists advocate for decentralized structures based on direct democracy and federal or confederal associations such as citizens'/popular assemblies, cooperatives, libertarian municipalism, trade unions and workers' councils. This is done within a general call for liberty and free association through the identification, criticism and practical dismantling of illegitimate authority in all aspects of human life. Libertarian socialism is distinguished from the authoritarian approach of Bolshevism and the reformism of Fabianism.

Past and present currents and movements commonly described as libertarian socialist include anarchism, as well as communalism, some forms of democratic socialism, guild socialism, Marxism (autonomism, council communism, left communism among others), participism and revolutionary syndicalism.

Overview

Name 
Libertarian socialism is also referred to as socialist libertarianism and often used interchangeably with the terms anarcho-socialism, anarchist socialism, free socialism, stateless socialism, and socialist anarchism.

Definition 

Libertarian socialists advocate the preservation of individual liberty, through the creation of a decentralized system of self-governance and the abolition of private property relations. According to Peter Hain, the core tenets of libertarian socialism are decentralization, democracy, popular sovereignty and individual liberty. Libertarian socialism, such as that advocated by Cornelius Castoriadis, generally upholds autonomy and direct democracy.

In the context of the European socialist movement, the term libertarian has been conventionally used to describe socialists who opposed authoritarianism and state socialism, such as Mikhail Bakunin. The association of socialism with libertarianism predates that of capitalism, and many anti-authoritarians still decry what they see as a mistaken association of capitalism with libertarianism in the United States. As Noam Chomsky put it, a consistent libertarian "must oppose private ownership of the means of production and wage slavery, which is a component of this system, as incompatible with the principle that labor must be freely undertaken and under the control of the producer".

Libertarian socialists seek the abolition of the state without going through a state capitalist transitionary stage.

Anti-capitalism 

According to John O'Neil, "[i]t is forgotten that the early defenders of commercial society like [Adam] Smith were as much concerned with criticising the associational blocks to mobile labour represented by guilds as they were to the activities of the state. The history of socialist thought includes a long associational and anti-statist tradition prior to the political victory of the Bolshevism in the east and varieties of Fabianism in the west".

Libertarian socialism upholds individual self-ownership, as well as the collective ownership of the means of production.

Anti-authoritarianism and opposition to the state 

Libertarian philosophy generally regards concentrations of power as sources of oppression that must be continually challenged and justified. Most libertarian socialists believe that when power is exercised as exemplified by the economic, social, or physical dominance of one individual over another, the burden of proof is always on the authoritarian to justify their action as legitimate when taken against its effect of narrowing the scope of human freedom. Libertarian socialists oppose rigid and stratified authority structures, whether political, economic, or social.

Political roots

Within early modern socialist thought 
For Roderick T. Long, libertarian socialists claim the 17th century English Levellers and the 18th-century French Encyclopédistes among their ideological forebears.

Within modern socialist thought 
In a chapter of his Economic Justice and Democracy (2005) recounting the history of libertarian socialism, economist Robin Hahnel relates that the period where libertarian socialism had its most significant impact was at the end of the 19th century through the first four decades of the 20th century. According to Hahnel, "libertarian socialism was as powerful a force as social democracy and communism" in the early 20th century. The Anarchist St. Imier International, referred by Hahnel as the Libertarian International, was founded at the 1872 Congress of St. Imier a few days after the split between Marxists and libertarians at The Hague Congress of the First International, referred to by Hahnel as the Socialist International. This Libertarian International "competed successfully against social democrats and communists alike for the loyalty of anticapitalist activists, revolutionaries, workers, unions and political parties for over fifty years". For Hahnel, libertarian socialists "played a major role in the Russian revolutions of 1905 and 1917. Libertarian socialists played a dominant role in the Mexican Revolution of 1911. Twenty years after World War I was over, libertarian socialists were still strong enough to spearhead the social revolution that swept across Republican Spain in 1936 and 1937".

Anarchism 

Libertarian socialism has its roots in both classical liberalism and socialism, though it is often in conflict with liberalism (especially neoliberalism and right-libertarianism) and authoritarian state socialism simultaneously. While libertarian socialism has roots in socialism and liberalism, different forms have different levels of influence from the two traditions. For instance, mutualist anarchism is more influenced by liberalism, while communist and syndicalist anarchism are more influenced by socialism. However, mutualist anarchism originates in 18th- and 19th-century European socialism (such as Fourierian socialism), while communist and syndicalist anarchism have their earliest origins in early 18th-century liberalism (such as the French Revolution).

Anarchism posed an early challenge to the vanguardism and statism it detected in important sectors of the socialist movement. As such: "The consequences of the growth of parliamentary action, ministerialism, and party life, charged the anarchists, would be de-radicalism and embourgeoisiement. Further, state politics would subvert both true individuality and true community. In response, many anarchists refused Marxist-type organisation, seeking to dissolve or undermine power and hierarchy by loose political-cultural groupings or by championing organisation by a single, simultaneously economic and political administrative unit (Ruhle, syndicalism). The power of the intellectual and of science were also rejected by many anarchists: "In conquering the state, in exalting the role of parties, they [intellectuals] reinforce the hierarchical principle embodied in political and administrative institutions". Revolutions could only come through force of circumstances and/or the inherently rebellious instincts of the masses (the "instinct for freedom") (Bakunin, Chomsky), or in Bakunin's words: "All that individuals can do is to clarify, propagate, and work out ideas corresponding to the popular instinct".

Marxism 

Marxism started to develop a libertarian strand of thought after specific circumstances. Chamsy Ojeili said: "One does find early expressions of such perspectives in [William] Morris and the Socialist Party of Great Britain (the SPGB), then again around the events of 1905, with the growing concern at the bureaucratisation and de-radicalisation of international socialism".

However, "the most important ruptures are to be traced to the insurgency during and after the First World War. Disillusioned with the capitulation of the social democrats, excited by the emergence of workers' councils, and slowly distanced from Leninism, many communists came to reject the claims of socialist parties and to put their faith instead in the masses". For these socialists, "[t]he intuition of the masses in action can have more genius in it than the work of the greatest individual genius". Rosa Luxemburg's workerism and spontaneism are exemplary of positions later taken up by the far-left of the period—Antonie Pannekoek, Roland Holst and Herman Gorter in the Netherlands, Sylvia Pankhurst in Britain, Antonio Gramsci in Italy and György Lukács in Hungary. In these formulations, the dictatorship of the proletariat was to be the dictatorship of a class, "not of a party or of a clique". However, within this line of thought, "[t]he tension between anti-vanguardism and vanguardism has frequently resolved itself in two diametrically opposed ways: the first involved a drift towards the party; the second saw a move towards the idea of complete proletarian spontaneity. [...] The first course is exemplified most clearly in Gramsci and Lukacs. [...] The second course is illustrated in the tendency, developing from the Dutch and German far-lefts, which inclined towards the complete eradication of the party form".

For many Marxian libertarian socialists, "the political bankruptcy of socialist orthodoxy necessitated a theoretical break. This break took a number of forms. The Bordigists and the SPGB championed a super-Marxian intransigence in theoretical matters. Other socialists made a return "behind Marx" to the anti-positivist programme of German idealism. Libertarian socialism has frequently linked its anti-authoritarian political aspirations with this theoretical differentiation from orthodoxy. [...] Karl Korsch [...] remained a libertarian socialist for a large part of his life and because of the persistent urge towards theoretical openness in his work. Korsch rejected the eternal and static, and he was obsessed by the essential role of practice in a theory's truth. For Korsch, no theory could escape history, not even Marxism. In this vein, Korsch even credited the stimulus for Marx's Capital to the movement of the oppressed classes". 

Several libertarian socialists, notably Noam Chomsky, believe that anarchism shares much in common with specific variants of Marxism, such as the council communism of Marxist Anton Pannekoek. In his Notes on Anarchism, Chomsky suggests the possibility "that some form of council communism is the natural form of revolutionary socialism in an industrial society. It reflects the belief that democracy is severely limited when the industrial system is controlled by any form of autocratic elite, whether of owners, managers, and technocrats, a 'vanguard' party, or a State bureaucracy".

In the United Kingdom, the group Solidarity was founded in 1960 by a small group of expelled members of the Trotskyist Socialist Labour League. Almost from the start, it was strongly influenced by the French Socialisme ou Barbarie group, in particular by its intellectual leader Cornelius Castoriadis, whose essays were among the many pamphlets Solidarity produced. The group's intellectual leader was Chris Pallis, who wrote under the name Maurice Brinton.

Autonomist Marxism, neo-Marxism and Situationist theory are also regarded as anti-authoritarian variants of Marxism that are firmly within the libertarian socialist tradition. As such, "[i]n New Zealand, no situationist group was formed, despite the attempts of Grant McDonagh. Instead, McDonagh operated as an individual on the periphery of the anarchist milieu, co-operating with anarchists to publish several magazines, such as Anarchy and KAT. The latter called itself 'an anti-authoritarian spasmodical' of the 'libertarian ultra-left (situationists, anarchists and libertarian socialists)'".

Notable tendencies

Anarchist 

Historically, anarchism and libertarian socialism have mainly been synonymous. Principally this regards the currents of classical anarchism, developed in the 19th century, in their commitments to autonomy and freedom, decentralization, opposing hierarchy, and opposing the vanguardism of authoritarian socialism.

Anarcho-syndicalist Gaston Leval explained: "We therefore foresee a Society in which all activities will be coordinated, a structure that has, at the same time, sufficient flexibility to permit the greatest possible autonomy for social life, or for the life of each enterprise, and enough cohesiveness to prevent all disorder. [...] In a well-organised society, all of these things must be systematically accomplished by means of parallel federations, vertically united at the highest levels, constituting one vast organism in which all economic functions will be performed in solidarity with all others and that will permanently preserve the necessary cohesion".

Marxist 
A broad scope of economic and political philosophies that draw on the anti-authoritarian aspects of Marxism have been described as "Libertarian Marxism", a tendency which emphasises autonomy, federalism and direct democracy. Wayne Price identified it most closely with the tendency of autonomist Marxism and identified libertarian characteristics within council communism, the Johnson–Forest Tendency, the Socialisme ou Barbarie group and the Situationist International, contrasting them with tendencies of Orthodox Marxism such as social democracy and Marxism-Leninism. Michael Löwy and Olivier Besancenot have identified Rosa Luxemburg, Walter Benjamin, André Breton and Daniel Guérin as prominent figures of libertarian Marxism.

Other 
Other libertarian socialist currents include post-classical anarchist tendencies and tendencies that cannot be easily classified within the anarchist/Marxist division.

Democratic socialism 

Labour Party minister Peter Hain has written in support of libertarian socialism, identifying an axis involving a "bottom-up vision of socialism, with anarchists at the revolutionary end and democratic socialists [such as himself] at its reformist end" as opposed to the axis of state socialism with Marxist–Leninists at the revolutionary end and social democrats at the reformist end. Another recent mainstream Labour politician who has been described as a libertarian socialist is Robin Cook. In the United States, there is a Libertarian Socialist Caucus within the Democratic Socialists of America.

Within the New Left 

The emergence of the New Left in the 1960s led to a revival of interest in libertarian socialism. The New Left's critique of the Old Left's authoritarianism was associated with a strong interest in personal liberty and autonomy, which led to a rediscovery of older socialist traditions, such as left communism, council communism, and the Industrial Workers of the World.

Market anarchism 

Market anarchism is a left-libertarian and individualist anarchist form of libertarian socialism that stresses the value of radically free markets, termed freed markets to distinguish them from the common conception which these libertarians believe to be riddled with statist and capitalist privileges.

See also 
 Freiwirtschaft ("free economy"), idea based on the "natural economic order"
 Mao-Spontex, Western Europe political movement of the 1960s–70s combining Maoism and spontaneism
 Sociocracy, governance system using consent, rather than majority voting
 Libertarianism, a political philosophy that upholds liberty as a core principle

References

Bibliography

External links 
 

 
Anarchism
Anti-capitalism
Anti-Stalinist left
Communism
Economic ideologies
History of anarchism
Socialism
History of socialism
Individualist anarchism
Socialism
Socialism
Socialism
Social anarchism
Socialism